Euston may refer to:

Places 
Euston, New South Wales, Australia
Euston, Suffolk, England
Euston Road, London
Euston Square, London
Euston, London

Stations in London 
Euston bus station
Euston railway station
Euston tube station
Euston Square tube station

See also 
Euston Arch, former arch that stood in front of the London railway station
Euston Films, British film and television production company
Euston Hall, Suffolk
Euston Tower, London
Euston Manifesto, named for Euston Road
Earl of Euston, title of the Duke of Grafton